Soda Bay is a census-designated place in Lake County, California. The population was 1,016 at the 2010 census.

A resort at the place, called Soda Bay Springs, could by 1910 accommodate 150 guests.

Geography

Demographics
The 2010 United States Census reported that Soda Bay had a population of 1,016. The racial makeup of Soda Bay was 843 (83.0%) White, 16 (1.6%) African American, 14 (1.4%) Native American, 12 (1.2%) Asian, 0 (0.0%) Pacific Islander, 102 (10.0%) from other races, and 29 (2.9%) from two or more races. Hispanic or Latino of any race were 171 persons (16.8%).

The Census reported that 1,008 people (99.2% of the population) lived in households, 8 (0.8%) lived in non-institutionalized group quarters, and 0 (0%) were institutionalized.

There were 462 households, out of which 88 (19.0%) had children under the age of 18 living in them, 217 (47.0%) were opposite-sex married couples living together, 38 (8.2%) had a female householder with no husband present, 22 (4.8%) had a male householder with no wife present.  There were 37 (8.0%) unmarried opposite-sex partnerships, and 9 (1.9%) same-sex married couples or partnerships. 141 households (30.5%) were made up of individuals, and 53 (11.5%) had someone living alone who was 65 years of age or older. The average household size was 2.18.  There were 277 families (60.0% of all households); the average family size was 2.66.

The population was spread out, with 169 people (16.6%) under the age of 18, 66 people (6.5%) aged 18 to 24, 156 people (15.4%) aged 25 to 44, 364 people (35.8%) aged 45 to 64, and 261 people (25.7%) who were 65 years of age or older.  The median age was 54.0 years. For every 100 females, there were 99.6 males.  For every 100 females age 18 and over, there were 97.4 males.

The homeowner vacancy rate was 5.8%; the rental vacancy rate was 14.1%.  706 people (69.5% of the population) lived in owner-occupied housing units and 302 people (29.7%) lived in rental housing units.

References

Census-designated places in Lake County, California
Census-designated places in California